Anna Kennedy (born 18 June 1986 in Christchurch, New Zealand) is a New Zealand netball player. Kennedy plays in the ANZ Championship for the Canterbury Tactix. In 2009, she was named as a member of the Silver Ferns squad. She was included in the FastNet Ferns the following year, and was called back into the Silver Ferns for 2011 as cover for injured vice-captain Temepara George. She made the team for the 2011 Netball World Championships after Cathrine Latu was ruled ineligible.

She has been in and out of the Silver Ferns team, most recently she played in the first leg of the 2012 Quad Series. She also made the team for the 2013 Fast5 Series, making her the only New Zealand player to contest all five World Netball Series tournaments.

She has re-signed with the Canterbury Tactix for the 2014 season, as their only remaining foundation player.

Her older brother Luke Thompson is a professional rugby union player who played 39 matches for Japan.

References

External links
 2010 ANZ Championship profile
 2011 Silver Ferns profile

New Zealand netball players
Mainland Tactix players
New Zealand international netball players
Netball players from Christchurch
1986 births
Living people
ANZ Championship players
Manchester Thunder players
2011 World Netball Championships players
Canterbury Flames players
New Zealand international Fast5 players
Northern Stars players